Josie Munnelly (March 1915 – June 1996) was an Irish Gaelic footballer. His league and championship career at senior level with the Mayo county team lasted fourteen seasons from 1934 until 1948.

Munnelly made his senior debut for Mayo during the 1934–35 league and quickly became a regular member of the starting fifteen. Over the course of the following fourteen seasons he enjoyed much success, the highlight being in 1936 when he won an All-Ireland medal. Munnelly also won four Connacht medals and six National Football League medals. After ending his senior career, Munnelly joined the Mayo junior team and won an All-Ireland medal in that grade in 1957.

Honours
Castlebar Mitchels
Mayo Senior Football Championship (13): 1932, 1934, 1941, 1942, 1944, 1945, 1946, 1948, 1950, 1951, 1952, 1953, 1954

Mayo
All-Ireland Senior Football Championship (1): 1936
Connacht Senior Football Championship (4): 1935, 1936, 1937, 1939
National Football League (6): 1934–35, 1935–36, 1936–37, 1937–38, 1938–39, 1940–41
All-Ireland Junior Football Championship (1): 1957
Connacht Junior Football Championship (1): 1957

Connacht
Railway Cup (2): 1937, 1938

References

1915 births
1996 deaths
Castlebar Mitchels Gaelic footballers
Connacht inter-provincial Gaelic footballers
Mayo inter-county Gaelic footballers
People from Crossmolina
Psychiatric nurses